Uccle or Ukkel is one of the 19 municipalities of the Brussels-Capital Region, Belgium. In common with all of Brussels' municipalities, it is legally bilingual (French–Dutch). It is generally considered an affluent area of the city and is particularly noted for its community of French immigrants.

History
According to legend, Uccle's Church of St. Peter was dedicated by Pope Leo III in the year 803, with Charlemagne and Gerbald, Bishop of Liège, attending the ceremony.  During the following centuries, several noble families built their manors and took residency there. The first mention of the name Woluesdal, now evolved into Wolvendael, dates from 1209. In 1467, Isabella of Portugal, wife of Philip the Good, Duke of Burgundy, founded a Franciscan convent on Uccle's territory. Later, Uccle became the judiciary capital of the area including Brussels. Throughout the early stages of its history, however, the village of Uccle always had a predominantly rural character and lived mostly from the products of forestry and agriculture.

At the end of the 18th century, a few years after the French Revolution, Uccle merged with neighbouring territories to become a municipality, with its own burgomaster (mayor) and municipal assembly. It had to wait until 1828, however, for the Dutch authorities to allow the construction of the first Municipal Hall. This was a time of economic prosperity and growth, stimulated by the proximity to the two main roads linking Brussels to the industrial south. A newer and larger Municipal Hall was built between 1872 and 1882. Banker and philanthropist Georges Brugmann was instrumental in the urbanisation of the municipality just before the turn of the 20th century. In the early 20th century, Michel van Gelder introduced a new breed of chicken, the d'Uccle, named after the town. Despite the accelerated rate of construction that took place in the early 20th century, Uccle succeeded in keeping several of its green areas intact, which now attract many of the Brussels area's wealthier inhabitants.

Lying beyond Forest and Ixelles and skirting the Sonian Forest, Uccle is Brussel's largest and southernmost commune. Large, 19th and 20th century villas with generous gardens make this green and calm suburb a favourite with well-off expatriates, with the Art Deco area around the Royal Observatory of Belgium and the fringes of the Sonian Forest the two most desirable addresses.

Lordship of Stalle
A large part of the territory of modern-day Uccle used to be part of the Lordship (seigneurie) of Stalle, in addition to the old village of Uccle and the barony of Carloo.

The first Lords of Stalle (High Justiciaries) were:
 I. Henri de Stalle, knight, died before 1357;
 II. Florent de Stalle, his son, alderman of Brussels in 1319 and knight. He married Lady Aleyde;
 III. Florent de Stalle, knight and alderman of Brussels in 1357, member of the Seven Noble Houses of Brussels. It was he who, with his brother Daniel, founded the Stalle chapel and gave it lands.

Dependent fiefs of the Lordship of Stalle

Fief of Overhem 
This fief was located between the Dieweg and Stalle, it had a manor, a mill called Clipmolen, woods, and pasture. However, in 1465, Marguerite Hinckaert wife of Louis de Mailly, obtained from the sovereign the annexation of this fief to the Lordship of Stalle.

Fief of the Roetaert
This fief was located in Neerstalle, between the Kersbeek woods and the Ukkelbeek. Its surface amounted to 39.78 acres of land and meadows and it included the manor of Roetaert.

Main sights
Uccle is mainly a residential area but has a lot of parks and forested areas, such as the Wolvendael Park and the Verrewinkel Woods. Wolvendael is the site of a 1763 castle, owned by a number of notable aristocrats from the 18th and 19th centuries. The municipality is also situated to the immediate west of the Bois de la Cambre/Ter Kamerenbos. The / and the area near St. Peter's Church and the Municipal Hall are two older parts of town, now filled with a happy mix of stores and pubs.

Uccle is the site of the Belgium national weather station, the Royal Meteorological Institute (IRM/KMI). Any information on Belgian weather, unless region-specific, is described by the statistics recorded there. Right next door is the Royal Observatory of Belgium.

Other points of interest include:
 Uccle Cemetery, also known as Dieweg Cemetery, created following a cholera epidemic in Brussels in 1866. Although burials ended in 1958, the grave of Hergé, the creator of Tintin who died in 1983, can be found there. 
 The Bloemenwerf, a turn of the 20th century (1900) Art Nouveau villa built by architect Henry Van de Velde.
 Nemo 33, the second deepest indoor swimming pool in the world.
 The Château de La Fougeraie, built in 1911 for the industrialist Paul Wittouck by the architects Louis Süe and Paul Huillard, and decorated by Gustave Louis Jaulmes.

Education

Most of Uccle pupils between the ages of 3 and 18 go to schools organised by the French-speaking Community or the Flemish Community. Other schools include:
 European School, Brussels I
 Lycée Français Jean Monnet
 Collège Saint-Pierre, founded in 1905 by Cardinal Pierre-Lambert Goossens

Notable inhabitants

 Armand Abel (1903–1973), academic and scholar of Islam
 Salvatore Adamo (b. 1943), singer, lyricist, poet and novelist
 Jean Améry (Hans Maier) (1912–1978), author and essayist
 Queen Mathilde of Belgium (b. 1973)
 Sandrine Blancke (b. 1978), actress
 Cédric Blanpain (b. 1970), academic, researcher
 Dedryck Boyata, football player
 Laetitia Darche (b. 1991), model
 Roger De Coster (b. 1944), professional motocross racer
 Maxime De Zeeuw (b. 1987), basketball player for Hapoel Holon of the Israeli Basketball Premier League
 Jaco van Dormael (b. 1957), film director
 Jef Dutilleux (1876–1960), impressionist painter
 M. C. Escher (1898–1972), Dutch graphic artist
 Lara Fabian (b. 1970), singer-songwriter
 Jean-Michel Folon (1934–2005), artist, illustrator, painter, and sculptor
 Isabelle Gatti de Gamond, educationalist, feminist, and politician (1839–1905)
 Martin Gray (1922–2016), Warsaw Ghetto and Holocaust survivor, writer
 Pierre Harmel (1911–2010), lawyer, politician, diplomat, and Prime Minister
 Hergé (1907–1983), comic book author, creator of The Adventures of Tintin
 Vincent Kompany (b. 1986), football defender and manager, former captain of the Belgium national team and current manager of Burnley
 Boris Johnson, Stanley Johnson, Jo Johnson, Rachel Johnson, Charlotte Johnson Wahl; British political and journalistic family, lived there in the 1970s.
 Joachim Lafosse (b. 1975), film director
 Prince Wenzeslaus of Liechtenstein and Prince Rudolf of Liechtenstein (b. 1974 and 1975, respectively)
 Marianne Merchez (b. 1960), doctor and astronaut
 Axel Merckx (b. 1972), professional road bicycle racer
 Philippe Moureaux (1939–2018), politician, senator, mayor of Molenbeek, and Professor of Economic History at the Université libre de Bruxelles (ULB)
 Erik Pevernagie (b. 1939), painter and writer
 Louis Pevernagie (1904–1970), painter
 Alizée Poulicek (b. 1987), Miss Universe Belgium 2008
 Joseph Raphael (1869–1950), impressionist painter
 Axelle Red (Fabienne Demal) (b. 1968), singer
 Sybille de Selys Longchamps (b. 1941), baroness and aristocrat
 Willy Sommers (b. 1952), crooner
 Olivier Strebelle (1927–2017), sculptor
 Jacques Tits (1930–2021), mathematician
 Henry van de Velde (1863–1957), painter, architect, and interior designer
 Angèle Van Laeken, better known as Angèle (b. 1995), singer-songwriter
  (b. 2001), singer-songwriter
 Princess Stephanie of Windisch-Graetz (1909–2005), died there.

Twin cities
 Neuilly-sur-Seine, France

References

Notes

External links

 Official website 

 
Municipalities of the Brussels-Capital Region
Populated places in Belgium